The Train of Many Colors (also referred to as TOMC) is one of the New York Transit Museum's nostalgia trains used for excursions, which is made up of cars that were formerly used on Interborough Rapid Transit Company (IRT) lines. The name comes from the fact that the cars are painted in many varying schemes from different eras.

During the 2004 Subway Centennial, some of the cars were used for regular service on the 42nd Street Shuttle route. In addition, the cars may be used to commemorate a special occasion (e.g. the opening of CitiField in Queens).

Some of the cars are housed in the New York Transit Museum when not used for excursions (R12, R15, R17, and R33S). Others are stored at the 207th Street Yard.

List of cars and colors 
There are 17 cars painted in various schemes, as listed below.

References

New York City Transit Subway Centennial press release, describing two museum trains that ran in 2004 in route service.
New York City Transit's 'Train of Many Colors'

External links
 

New York City Subway rolling stock